Ravensburg is a town in Baden-Württemberg, Germany.

Ravensberg, Ravensburg, or Ravensburgh may also refer to:

Places

Buildings 
 , a castle in Sulzfeld, Baden-Württemberg
 , ruin of a burgwall or gord in Neubrandenburg, Germany
 Ravensburgh Castle, an iron age camp in Hexron, Hertfordshire, England
 Veitsburg, Ravensburg, historical name of a castle in Baden-Württemberg, Germany

Inhabited places
 County of Ravensberg, historical county of the Holy Roman Empire
 Ravensburg (district), district in Baden-Württemberg, Germany
 Ravensberg, a city district of Kiel, Schleswig-Holstein, Germany

Natural formations
 , a hill in Brandenburg, Germany
 Kleiner Ravensberg, an elevation near Potsdam, Germany
 Ravensberg (Harz), a mountain near Bad Sachsa, Germany
 Ravensberg Basin or Ravensberg Hills, a natural region in North Rhine-Westphalia, Germany
 Ravensberg Land, a cultural landscape in North Rhine-Westphalia, Germany

Other places
 County of Ravensberg, historical territory in Germany
 Minden-Ravensberg, administrative unit of Prussia (1719–1807)
 Ravensburg State Park, Clinton County, Pennsylvania, United States

People
 Margaret of Ravensberg (c. 1320 – 13 February 1389), daughter and heiress of Otto IV, Count of Ravensberg
 House of Calvelage-Ravensberg, rulers of the counties of Calvelage and Ravensberg, 12th–14th centuries

Other uses
 FV Ravensburg, German association football club, Baden-Württemberg, Germany
 Ravensburg University of Cooperative Education, Ravensburg, Stuttgart and Friedrichshafen, Germany
 Ravensburg (album), a 2018 album by Mathias Eick

See also 
 Ravensbrück, German concentration camp exclusively for women, 1939–1945
 Ravensburger, German game and toy company
 The White Roses of Ravensberg (disambiguation)